Itcha Ilgachuz Provincial Park is a provincial park in the Chilcotin Country of British Columbia, Canada. The park is 111,977 hectares in size and contains Far Mountain and Mount Downton, its two most prominent peaks.

History and conservation
Established in 1995 the park was recommended for protection under the Cariboo-Chilcotin Land-Use Plan, and designated a Class A Park.

Itcha Ilgachuz protects alpine grasslands, wetlands, and wildlife habitat. The Itcha Range and Ilgachuz Range are shield volcanoes that formed 5 and 2.5 million years ago as the North American Plate drifted over the Anahim hotspot. These ranges are situated in the rain shadow of the Coast Mountains, and support a high diversity of plant and animal species including woodland caribou.

Recreation
The park has a network of unmaintained trails for hikers or equestrian users. One trail is open to mountain biking. Wilderness backcountry camping and fishing or hunting (with a license) are permitted. Fish habitat is limited by steep terrain, with Itcha Lake supporting populations of rainbow trout and bull trout.

In winter, a network of snowmobile trails and play areas is available that avoids the preferred winter range of the woodland caribou.

Location
The park is north of BC Highway 20 near the community of Anahim Lake. There are no roads in the park.

References

External links

Geography of the Chilcotin
Provincial parks of British Columbia
1995 establishments in British Columbia
Protected areas established in 1995